National net wealth, also known as national net worth, is the total sum of the value of a country's assets minus its liabilities. It refers to the total value of net wealth possessed by the residents of a state at a set point in time. This figure is an important indicator of a nation's ability to take on debt and sustain spending and is influenced not only by real estate prices, equity market prices, exchange rates, liabilities and incidence in a country of the population, but also by human resources, natural resources and capital and technological advancements, which may create new assets or render others worthless in the future. The most significant component by far among most developed nations is commonly reported as household net wealth or worth, and reflects infrastructure investment. National wealth can fluctuate, as evidenced in the United States after the Great Recession and subsequent economic recovery. During periods when equity markets experience strong growth, the relative national and per capita wealth of the countries where people are more exposed on those markets, such as the United States and United Kingdom, tend to rise. On the other hand, when equity markets are depressed, the relative wealth of the countries where people invest more in real estate and bonds, such as France and Italy, tend to rise instead.

Total wealth by country 

* indicates "Wealth in COUNTRY or TERRITORY" or "Economy of COUNTRY or TERRITORY" links.

Countries ranking through time 
 
In the following table are ranked the 30 countries by the largest national net wealth from 2000 to 2021 according to Credit Suisse S.A. (September 2022).

Shares of global wealth
The following table indicates the share of global wealth of the ten wealthiest countries by net national wealth at given years. The share of global wealth of a country that is 5% or greater at a given year is in bold.

See also 

 List of countries by financial assets per capita
 G7
 Distribution of wealth
 Affluence in the United States
 Wealth distribution in Europe

References 

Macroeconomic aggregates
total wealth